Colleen Green (born 23 October 1984) is an American indie pop musician from Los Angeles, California. She is currently signed to Hardly Art records.

Career 
Green released her first album, Milo Goes to Compton, in 2011, through Art Fag; it was originally released as a cassette tape. Her sophomore release, Sock It To Me, came out in 2013, now through Hardly Art. Green's third album, I Want to Grow Up, her first release to be recorded with a band in a studio, was released on February 24, 2015 to widespread critical acclaim. "I Want to Grow Up" is her most commercially successful album to date as well. In 2021 she announced "Cool", her fourth album via Hardly Art. 

In September 2015 Green was voted Best Solo Artist by the readers of LA Weekly. Her song "Wild One" was featured on the Netflix series Love.

Green has toured through almost all continents. She has played concerts in Mexico, Brazil, Chile, Japan, Canada, The United States, Australia, as well as several countries in Europe, such as England, France, Germany, Scotland and Belgium.

Green hand draws her merchandising and tour posters.

Is missing a tooth.

Discography

Studio albums

Extended plays

References

Singers from Los Angeles
American indie pop musicians
1984 births
Living people
Hardly Art artists
21st-century American women singers
21st-century American singers